KF Malisheva is a professional football club from Kosovo which competes in the Superleague of Kosovo. The club is based in Malishevë. Their home ground is the Liman Gegaj Stadium which has a seating capacity of 1,800.

Players

Current squad

See also
List of football clubs in Kosovo

References

Football clubs in Kosovo
Association football clubs established in 2000